The 2022–23 Women’s Euro Hockey Tour was the third season of the Women's Euro Hockey Tour (EHT) since the tournament season format was revised and expanded in 2018. It followed the 2019–20 Women's Euro Hockey Tour, as the 2020–21 and 2021–22 instances of the international ice hockey tournament season were not held due to the COVID-19 pandemic. 

The season comprised three five-nation tournaments, hosted in Finland, Sweden, and Germany, respectively. The women’s national teams of Czechia, Finland, Germany, Sweden, and Switzerland participated in every tournament. The Russian national team was not invited to participate pursuant to the suspension of Russian teams from participation in all IIHF competitions and events on 1 March 2022 in response to the 2022 Russian invasion of Ukraine.

Five Nations Tournament in Vierumäki
The 2022–23 season began with the Five Nations Tournament in Vierumäki (also stylized as “5 nations tournament”) during 8–12 November 2022.

Finland swept the tournament to claim a decisive victory for the host nation. Finnish players also topped all of the statistics tables: Noora Tulus led tournament scoring with 7 points; Viivi Vainikka scored the most goals, with 5; and Anni Keisala topped the goaltending tables with a 96.3 save percentage and 1.00 goals against average.

Standings

Results
All times local, Eastern European Time (UTC+02:00)

Top Scorers
 Noora Tulus (F): 4 GP, 1 G, 6 A, 7 Pts, 0 PIM
 Viivi Vainikka (F): 4 GP, 5 G, 0 A, 5 Pts, 0 PIM
 Fanny Rask (F): 4 GP, 3 G, 2 A, 5 Pts, 4 PIM
 Rosa Lindstedt (F): 4 GP, 0 G, 5 A, 5 Pts, 2 PIM
 Felizia Wikner Zienkiewicz (F): 4 GP, 2 G, 2 A, 4 Pts, 0 PIM
 Daniela Pejšová (D): 3 GP, 1 G, 3 A, 4 Pts, 0 PIM
 Sofie Lundin (F): 4 GP, 1 G, 3 A, 4 Pts, 0 PIM
 Hanna Olsson (F): 4 GP, 1 G, 3 A, 4 Pts, 0 PIM
 Sanni Rantala (D): 4 GP, 1 G, 3 A, 4 Pts, 0 PIM
 Tereza Vanišová (F): 3 GP, 3 G, 0 A, 3 Pts, 4 PIM

Source: Finnish Ice Hockey Association

Top Goaltenders
 Anni Keisala: 2 GP, 120:00 TOI, 52 SA, 2 GA, 96.3 SV%, 1.00 GAA, 0 SO
 Felicity Luby: 2 GP, 88:38 TOI, 56 SA, 3 GA, 94.4 SV%, 2.03 GAA, 0 SO
 Ida Boman: 2 GP, 119:12 TOI, 37 SA, 2 GA, 94.9 SV%, 1.01 GAA, 1 SO
 Viktorie Švejdová: 2 GP, 117:53 TOI, 45 SA, 3 GA, 93.8 SV%, 1.53 GAA, 1 SO
 Sandra Heim: 2 GP, 100:00 TOI, 28 SA, 3 GA, 90.3 SV%, 1.80 GAA, 1 SO

Source: Finnish Ice Hockey Association

Player awards 

Players of the Game
 GER v SWE: Bernadette Karpf (GER), Fanny Rask (SWE)
 SUI v FIN: Noemi Ryhner (SUI), Viivi Vainikka (FIN)
 SWE v CZE: Hanna Olsson (SWE), Michaela Pejzlová (CZE)
 SUI v GER: Lara Stalder (SUI), Felicity Luby (GER)
 FIN v SWE: Ronja Savolainen (FIN), Lina Ljungblom (SWE)
 CZE v GER: Cancelled due to power outage
 GER v FIN: Heidi Strompf (GER), Petra Nieminen (FIN)
 CZE v SUI: Alena Mills (CZE), Lisa Rüedi (SUI)
 FIN v CZE: Anni Keisala (FIN), Tereza Vanišová (CZE)
 SWE v SUI: Maja Nylén Persson (SWE), Janine Hauser (SUI)

Five Nations Tournament in Ängelholm
The Five Nations Tournament in Ängelholm and Helsingborg (also stylized as '5 Nations Tournament') was played during 13 December to 17 December 2022.

The tournament was another dominant showing for the Finns, who again swept all four of their matches. Switzerland placed second, losing only one game, and Swiss players ranked first on the scoring and goaltending statistics tables. Swiss centre Lara Stalder was an offensive powerhouse, scoring 5 goals and 10 points in four games to lead all skaters in goals and points; her 5 assists tied Finnish right winger Noora Tulus for most assists. Switzerland’s Saskia Maurer recorded both the best save percentage (96.5%) and the best goals against average (1.00) of all goaltenders.

Standings

Results
All times local, Central European Time (UTC+01:00)

Top scorers
Switzerland‘s Lara Stalder was the top scorer of the tournament, netting a tournament-leading 5 goals and 5 assists (tying Finland‘s Noora Tulus for most assists) for 10 points in four games. Both Switzerland and Finland had two players rank in the tournament top-five for scoring – Stalder and Alina Müller for the Swiss, Tulus and Petra Nieminen for the Finns – and Sweden had one player, Sara Hjalmarsson. The top-ten point scorers of the tournament featured four Finnish players (Tulus, Nieminen, Jenniina Nylund, and Viivi Vainikka), three Swedish players (Hjalmarsson, Lisa Johansson, and Josefin Bouveng), three Swiss players (Stalder, Müller, and Noemi Ryhner), and one Czech player, Klára Hymlárová. 

Germany was the only team not represented in the top-ten list. The highest scoring German player was Theresa Wagner, who scored the team‘s lone goal in the tournament. She ranked in fortieth place on the scoring table, in a four-way tie with Finland‘s Sanni Rantala, Sweden‘s Thea Johansson, and Switzerland‘s Nadine Hofstetter. Wagner‘s teammates, Celina Haider and Carina Strobel, were the only other Germans to record a point, both registering an assist on Wagner‘s goal.

Note: Bold indicates top scorer on team.

Source: Finnish Ice Hockey Association

Goaltenders

Source: Finnish Ice Hockey Association

Five Nations Tournament in Füssen

Finland earned another four-game sweep to claim first place in every tournament of the 2022–23 season. Six Finns featured on the top-ten scoring list, including top-scorer of the tournament Petra Nieminen (4+3), and Emilia Kyrkkö led all goaltenders with a 96.3 save percentage and 0.33 goals against average in her senior national team debut. Czechia had their strongest showing of the season, winning three of four games to place second in the standings. In third place, Sweden split their games with two wins and two losses, recording a goal difference of +2. Switzerland beat Germany to secure fourth place and tournament host Germany was held winless to finish in fifth.

Standings

Results

 

 

 

 

 

Top scorers

Goaltenders

Source: Finnish Ice Hockey Association

Player awards
Players of the Game
 FIN vs SUI: Oona Havana (FIN)
 FIN vs GER: Petra Nieminen (FIN)
 CZE vs FIN: Emilia Kyrkkö (FIN)
 SWE vs FIN: Jenni Hiirikoski (FIN)

Final standings

References

Game references

Official game sheets 

Women's ice hockey tournaments
Women
Euro
Sport in Heinola
Sports competitions in Ängelholm
Sports competitions in Bavaria
Sports competitions in Helsingborg
International ice hockey competitions hosted by Finland
International ice hockey competitions hosted by Sweden
International ice hockey competitions hosted by Germany